Sir (Thomas) William Evans, 1st Baronet (15 April 1821 – 4 October 1892) was an English Liberal politician who represented the constituency of South Derbyshire.

Background and education
Evans was the son of William Evans of Allestree, Derby, who was an MP and High Sheriff, and his wife Mary Gisborne. The Evans family  had made a fortune from lead mines at Bonsall, and an iron slitting and rolling mill in Derby and a cotton mill at Darley Abbey. They also owned the Evans Bank in Derby. However it was Evans' uncle, Samuel Evans, who ran the business. His own father, William Evans, had opted to take up the life of the landed gentleman at Allestree Hall. Evans was educated at Trinity College, Cambridge. Evans' father died in 1856 leaving him property including Pickford's House in Derby.

Political career
Evans became Member of Parliament for Derbyshire South in 1857 and held the seat until 1868. He regained it in 1874 and held it until 1885. He stood unsuccessfully as the Liberal Unionist candidate for Derby in 1886.

He was a local philanthropist, being responsible for building a school in Parwich in 1861 and then rebuilding Parwich church in 1873. Evans continued to own the Evans Bank until it merged in 1877 with the older Derby-based Compton's Bank.
Evans was created a baronet of Allestree Hall on 18 July 1887. He chaired the first meeting of the Derbyshire County Council on 1 April 1889 when the authority consisted of 60 councillors and 20  aldermen. He was High Sheriff of Derbyshire in 1872, and a Deputy Lieutenant, Justice of the Peace and Fellow of the Royal Geographical Society. As well as Allestree Hall, he owned the manor of Holbrooke, the Parwich Hall estate and a house in Derby.

Family

Evans married  Mary Gisborne on 21 May 1846. She was the eldest daughter of Thomas John Gisborne of Holme Hall, Bakewell, Derbyshire. He was present when the Queen came to open the Derbyshire Royal Infirmary as he was the President of the new hospital. On his death in Belper, in 1892, his baronetcy became extinct. He left his estate to William Gisborne.

References

External links 

	

1821 births
1892 deaths
Alumni of Trinity College, Cambridge
Baronets in the Baronetage of the United Kingdom
People from Allestree
Members of the Parliament of the United Kingdom for constituencies in Derbyshire
UK MPs 1857–1859
UK MPs 1859–1865
UK MPs 1865–1868
UK MPs 1874–1880
UK MPs 1880–1885
Deputy Lieutenants of Derbyshire
Fellows of the Royal Geographical Society
High Sheriffs of Derbyshire
Liberal Party (UK) MPs for English constituencies
Liberal Unionist Party parliamentary candidates